Akhand (also spelled Akand or Akon) is a surname of the Muslim communities of the Bangladesh and West Bengal of India.       

Notable people with the surname include:

Shahid Akhand
Happy Akhand
Lucky Akhand
Muntakim Ur Rahman Akhand

Indian surnames
Bengali-language surnames
Bangladeshi Muslim names
Bengali Muslim surnames